Advances in Difference Equations is a peer-reviewed mathematics journal covering research on difference equations, published by Springer Open.

The journal was established in 2004 and publishes articles on theory, methodology, and application of difference and differential equations. Originally published by Hindawi Publishing Corporation, the journal was acquired by Springer Science+Business Media in early 2011. The editors-in-chief are Ravi Agarwal, Martin Bohner, and Elena Braverman.

Abstracting and indexing 
The journal is abstracted and indexed by the Science Citation Index Expanded, Current Contents/Physical, Chemical & Earth Sciences, and Zentralblatt MATH. According to the Journal Citation Reports, the journal has a 2021 impact factor of 2.803. from July 1st, the journal has been transitioning to a new title that opens the scope of the journal to broader developments in theory and applications of models. Under the new title, Advances in Continuous and Discrete Models: Theory and Modern Applications, the journal will cover developments in machine learning, data driven modeling, differential equations, numerical analysis, scientific computing, control, optimization, and computing.

References

External links 

Mathematics journals
Publications established in 2004
English-language journals
Springer Science+Business Media academic journals
Open access journals